Time Change... A Natural Progression is the debut studio album by Sherbet released in December 1972. The album includes the bands hit singles "Can You Feel It, Baby?", "Free the People", "You're All Woman" and "You've Got the Gun". The album peaked at number 66 on the Kent Music Report.

Track listing

Personnel
 Daryl Braithwaite – vocals
 Garth Porter – organ, piano, vocals, wurlitzer electric piano
 Tony Mitchell – bass guitar, vocals
 Alan Sandow – drums
 Clive Shakespeare – guitar, vocals
 Bruce Worrall – bass guitar on "Can You Feel It Baby"

Charts

Certifications

Release history

References

Sherbet (band) albums
Festival Records albums
Infinity Records albums
1972 debut albums